Sierra Leone, officially the Republic of Sierra Leone, is a country in West Africa. The economy of Sierra Leone is that of a least developed country with a GDP of approximately US$1.9 billion in 2009. Since the end of the civil war in 2002 the economy is gradually recovering with a GDP growth rate between 4 and 7%. In 2008 its GDP in  PPP ranked between 147th (World Bank) and 153rd (CIA) largest in the world. Sierra Leone's economic development has always been hampered by an overdependence on mineral exploitation.  Successive governments and the population as a whole have always believed that "diamonds and gold" are sufficient generators of foreign currency earnings and lure for investment. As result large scale agriculture of commodity products, industrial development and sustainable investments have been neglected by governments. The economy could thus be described as based upon the extraction of unsustainable resources or non-reusable assets. Sierra Leone is a member of the WTO.

Notable firms 
This list includes notable companies with primary headquarters located in the country. The industry and sector follow the Industry Classification Benchmark taxonomy. Organizations which have ceased operations are included and noted as defunct.

See also
 Economy of Sierra Leone
 Sierra Leone Selection Trust
 List of banks in Sierra Leone

References

Companies of Sierra Leone
 
Sierra Leone